The Embassy of Angola in London is the diplomatic mission of Angola in the United Kingdom. The Angolan Embassy is located at w1, 22 Dorset St, London W1U 6QY.

The Angolan Embassy mission is to provide consular assistance to Angolan citizens residing in the United Kingdom and the Republic of Ireland and we have the authority to grant entry visas to Angola on behalf of British citizens and nationals of other countries residing in the United Kingdom of Great Britain and Northern Ireland Republic of Ireland. Angola Embassy - Embaixada de Angola.

Gallery

See also
List of diplomatic missions in London

References

External links
Official site

Diplomatic missions in London
Diplomatic missions of Angola
Angola–United Kingdom relations
Buildings and structures in the City of Westminster
Buildings and structures in Marylebone